The Lead with Jake Tapper is an afternoon and early evening newscast hosted by Jake Tapper on CNN and CNN International.

The show currently airs weekdays live from 4:00pm to 6:00pm ET.

The show contains a "lead" for different subjects. They are the National, Political, Money, Buried, Sports, World, Pop, Faith, Earth Matters, Tech, and Health leads.

History 
In 2013, the show was given a week of primetime re-run at 10pm ET. That week, the Boston marathon terror attack caused this rebroadcast to be axed in favor of a live edition of Anderson Cooper 360°.

Following Piers Morgan's departure from CNN in March 2014, CNN President Jeff Zucker had various anchors fill the 9pm ET slot as a test run. Among them was The Lead airing at 9pm ET for the weeks of April 7 and April 14.

The Lead with Jake Tapper was also broadcast via tape-delay on CNN Philippines every Tuesday-Saturday for one hour at 11:00 am, local time from February 15 to July 23, 2016. From March 16 until September 5, 2015, the show aired at 4:00 pm. The Lead moved its morning telecast to 9:00 am but was truncated to 30 minutes until late January 2016 when it was moved to 8:30 for at least a month.

Before August 2016, The Lead with Jake Tapper was axed on CNN Philippines as part of program restructuring.

On September 10, 2018, the program started to be simulcast on CNN International.

In October 2020, the show aired for two hours from 3pm to 5pm ET.  Brooke Baldwin's CNN Newsroom hour was removed for the month. The show went back to its usual air time in November after Baldwin returned.

In January 2021, CNN announced that the show would expand to two hours starting in April, taking over the former first hour of The Situation Room.

References

External links

CNN original programming
2000s American television news shows
2010s American television news shows